Let's Go Everywhere is an album of children's music released by Medeski Martin & Wood.

Track listing
All tracks by Medeski Martin & Wood.

"Waking Up" – 1:05
"Let's Go Everywhere" – 3:33
"Cat Creeps" – 2:46
"The Train Song" – 3:53
"Where's the Music" – 3:14
"Pat a Cake" – 1:10
"Pirates Don't Take Baths" – 2:41
"Far East Sweets" – 2:53
"On an Airplane" – 2:15
"The Squalb" – 3:17
"Let's Go" – 2:38
"Old Paint" – 2:42
"Hickory Dickory Dock" – 1:03
"All Around the Kitchen" – 2:28
"We're All Connected" – 4:07

References

2008 albums
Medeski Martin & Wood albums
Avant-garde jazz albums
Post-bop albums
Children's music albums